Hubei Institute of Fine Arts (HIFA, ; colloquially 湖美, pinyin: Húměi) is an art university in China. It is the only top institution of higher learning in fine arts in central China. It is regarded as one of the best and most selective academies of fine arts in China. Its history dates back to 1920, making it the first private art school in modern China. As one of the three oldest art universities, it is also one of the cradles of higher education of fine arts in modern China. It is located in Hubei Province's capital Wuhan, known as "the thoroughfare leading to nine provinces". Located in Wuhan, the industrial, economic and cultural center of central China, Hubei Institute of Fine Arts is widely regarded as a top academy of multiple disciplines, including watercolor painting, Chinese painting, oil painting, mural painting, mixed media painting, printmaking, sculpture, etc. HIFA has two campuses (Tanhualin campus and Canglongdao campus) and covers more than 488,000 square meters, which hold more than 500 faculty and staff members and more than 7,000 students.

History 

The academy dates back to Wuchang Fine Arts School, which was founded in 1920 by Jiang Lanpu, Tang Yijing and Xu Ziheng. In 1923, it was renamed Wuchang Specialised School of Fine Arts() and became one of the three oldest art academies in modern China. In 1930, it was renamed Private Wu Chang College of Fine Arts. In the mid-1930s, the college reached the heyday in terms of size, talent training and academic achievements, and became one of the most important art education bases in China. During the War of Resistance Against Japan, Wu Chang College of Fine Arts moved to Jiangjin, Sichuan Province in 1938 and returned to Wuhan after the victory. Despite the great difficulties during the anti-Japanese war, the college reached its another peak of development. The college made tremendous contributions to the establishment and development of the modern art education in China and laid the solid foundation for the art education in PRC.
After the founding of PRC in 1949, Wu Chang College of Fine Arts was merged into Central Plains University, Hubei Education College and Central China Normal College successively. In 1977, it developed into an independent college——Hubei Art Academy, which consisted of the Fine Arts Division and the Music Division. In 1985, with the approval of the then State Education Commission, the Fine Arts Division of Hubei Art Academy became Hubei Institute of Fine Arts, shaping the new setup of higher education of fine arts in contemporary China and opening the new chapter of development in the history of the academy.

Academic profile 
Hubei Institute of Fine Arts is an academy combining art education, creation, research and industry, which enjoys a pioneering and representative key place in higher education of fine arts in central China. By the end of 2009, the academy has 12 departments and schools, and they are the Department of Traditional Chinese Painting, the Department of Oil Painting, the Department of Printmaking, the Department of Sculpture, the Department of Mural Painting, the Department of Design, the Department of Industrial Design, the Department of Costume, the Department of Environmental Art and Design, the Department of Fine Arts Education, the Department of Fine Arts Studies and the Animation School. Boasting a complete range of art programs, the academy offers the postgraduate programs, undergraduate ones and junior college ones as well. Hubei Institute of Fine Arts enjoys a high academic status and a constellation of celebrated artists have taught and are teaching here. It has also brought up a great number of well-known artists. In October, 2009, the new campus at Canglongdao, Jiangxia, came into use, standing out as one of the notable landmarks in the history of the academy.

Among all the departments, Department of Watercolor Painting is especially distinctive due to its indelible mark on the domestic development of Chinese watercolor painting. In 2009, watercolor painting was set up by HIFA as an independent major direction, the first time in Chinese history of fine arts education. Since then, Liu Shouxiang, one of the most famous pioneers of Chinese watercolor painting in 1980s, has been working as the Dean of the Department of Watercolor Painting. Throughout twenty years of development, it now holds a teaching crew of 12 professors, well-equipped teaching facility and a self-constructed teaching discipline called "the course of Watercolor", which was awarded the National Elaborate Course in 2010. The department is known for its progress in exploring a unique style of Chinese watercolor painting by following in the cultural spirits of Chinese traditions as well as situating within the contemporary art environment. Fostered by Department of Watercolor Painting of HIFA, many graduates made contribution to national watercolor institutes, like Watercolor Painting Art Committee of China Artists Association, National Fine Art Exhibition, National Watercolor Painting Exhibition, etc.

Notable alumni 
 Zeng Fanzhi
 Ma Liuming
 Li Zhimin
 Wei Guangqing
 Cao Dan
 Liu Shouxiang

See also
 Chinese fine art

References

 Hubei Institute of Fine Arts

 
Universities and colleges in Wuhan
Educational institutions established in 1920
1920 establishments in China